is a city located on the north-eastern tip of the Shimabara Peninsula, facing Ariake Bay in the east and Mount Unzen (including Fugendake) in the west, in Nagasaki Prefecture, Kyushu, Japan. As of October 1, 2016, the city has an estimated population of 44,936 and a population density of 540 per km². The total area is 82.77 km².

Economy
Shimabara is a popular tourist destination, due to its historical associations, location in Unzen-Amakusa National Park, and numerous onsen. The most popular tourist destination within the urban area is Shimabara Castle and the nearby "Samurai Street". The city has so much natural spring water, both hot and cold, that it runs through the streets. On Carp Street, koi swim in the canals.

Principal agricultural products include mandarin oranges, tea, and tobacco.

History
Shimabara is a castle town, which was the capital of Shimabara Domain during the Edo period. It was the site of considerable foreign trade and missionary activity during the late Muromachi period, and in the early Edo period, a large percentage of the population were Kirishitan. Due to misgovernment, high taxes and persecution of Christianity, the population rose up during the Shimabara Rebellion of 1637, which was suppressed with extreme severity by the Tokugawa Bakufu. Shimabara was ruled by a branch of the Matsudaira clan from 1668 to 1774 and from 1774 to 1871.

Modern Shimabara City was founded on April 1, 1940 by the merger of former town of Shimabara with several surrounding villages.

On January 1, 2006, the town of Ariake (from Minamitakaki District) was merged into Shimabara.

Throughout its history, Shimabara has been dominated by the seismic activity of Mount Unzen. A major volcanic eruption in 1792 resulted in a tsunami that destroyed most of the town and killed over 15,000 people, in one of Japan's worst volcanic disasters. In more recent history, major eruptions in 1990–1991 resulted in pyroclastic flows, which killed 43 people and forced the temporary evacuation of hundreds of others. The 5th International Conference of Cities on Volcanoes was held in Shimabara on November 19–23, 2007.

Geography

Climate
Shimabara has a humid subtropical climate (Köppen:Cfa) with hot summers and cool winters.

Demographics
Per Japanese census data, the population of Shimabara in 2020 is 43,338 people. Shimabara has been conducting censuses since 1920. The city's population peaked in the 1950s with more than 60,000 people. In 2020, Shimabara's population is only about 75% of what it was in the 1950s.

Culture

Festivals

Shimabara is host of the Shimbara Water Festival on the first weekend of August. There are also festivals in Minamishimabara, like the Marine Festival in Kuchinotsu and the Minamishimabara Sakura Festivals.

Notable people
 Koumei Nakamura, celebrity chef
 Évelyne Sunatori, celebrity ALT of the JET programme

References

External links
 
 Shimabara City official website 
 Shimabara City official website 
 Shimabara Peninsula—Visit Nagasaki website 

Cities in Nagasaki Prefecture